The Genoa International Boat Show is one of the world's premier boat shows, held annually in Genoa (Italy, EU). The exhibition is organised by Confindustria Nautica, the Italian Marine Industry Association.

History 

Owing the popularity of nautical tourism along the Italian Riviera, as well as Genoa's history as a city for the ship and yacht building industry, the 1st International Boat Show was opened by Senator De Gregorio, Undersecretary to the Treasury, on 27 January 1962. With 300,000 visitors that year, the Genoa Boat Show was an instant success. 

Over the years, the Boat show grew mainly by an increasing number of exhibitors and professional organisations attending the show, and with the 46th International Boat Show in 2006, the marina underwent one of its most substantial extensions. In 2009 the new 20.000 sqm Pavilion B - designed by French architect Jean Nouvel - was opened.

Since its inception, the shows were officially opened by Italian government ministers of Economy and Finance, Infrastructures and Transports respectively. Next to the boot Düsseldorf trade fair, the Salone Nautico is regarded as one of the world's largest boat shows.

Exhibition spaces 

As the largest event on the Mediterranean, the Genoa Boat Show is the world’s number one showcase for the very best the Made in Italy brand has to offer, welcoming every year industry professionals and boating enthusiasts alike to over 200,000 square metres of display area on land and sea.

Since its first successful introduction in 2018, the Genoa Boat Show has taken on a new multi-specialised format, that of 4 Boat Shows in 1, each entirely complementary yet at the same time characterised by their own specific identities: no divisions, no limits, just an extension of the Genoa Boat Show’s key strength, that of being a cross-segment event with in-depth vertical support chains that define a tailored one-to-one relationship with each and every exhibitor and visitor.

The layout provides a TechTrade Fair dedicated to components and equipment, a sailing boat show (Sailing World), an area dedicated to outboard motorboats (Boat Discovery) and a Yacht and Superyacht Show.

See also 

 History of Genoa
 List of sailboat designers and manufacturers
 Shipbuilding companies of Italy

References

External links 
 Salone di Genoa 
 CONFINDUSTRIA NAUTICA, the Italian marine industry association 
 LiguriaNautica.com 

Boat shows
Genoa
Trade fairs in Italy
Jean Nouvel buildings
Tourist attractions in Genoa
Recurring events established in 1962
1962 establishments in Italy
Annual events in Italy